The Buxton National Historic Site and Museum is a tribute to the Elgin Settlement, established in 1849 by Rev. William King and an association which included Lord Elgin, then the Governor General of Canada.  King, a former slave owner turned abolitionist, purchased  of crown land in Southwestern Ontario and created a haven for fugitive slaves and free Blacks.

King brought 15 of his former slaves with him  where they could live a free life. The Elgin settlement was divided into  lots. These sold for $2.50/acre, with six percent interest, and could be paid over the course of ten years. For many fugitive slaves, the Buxton settlement was the final stop on the Underground Railroad from the United States.

Opened in 1967, the museum complex includes the main building with exhibits about the community and its history, an 1861 schoolhouse, an 1854 log cabin, and a barn.  Local historic church cemeteries are adjacent to the museum.  The museum is located in North Buxton, Ontario, near South Buxton in Chatham-Kent.

See also
 Anna Maria Weems an enslaved teenager who dresses as a male carriage driver and escaped to Canada where she was a student of the Buxton mission school.
 Indigenous Black Canadians
 Chatham Vigilance Committee
 Uncle Tom's Cabin Historic Site, a historic site built on the Dawn settlement, another former slave settlement in Ontario
 List of museums in Ontario

External links
Buxton Museum Official Webpage

National Historic Sites in Ontario
Museums in Chatham-Kent
History museums in Ontario
Underground Railroad locations
History of Black people in Canada
African-American museums in Canada
Black Canadian culture in Ontario
Black Canadian organizations